Matilde Artero  is a Spanish actress who appeared in films from 1926 through 1961.  She began her work in silent films, starting with Luis R. Alonso's La loca de la casa for Producciones Hornemann.  Her first talkie was as 'Pepita' with Carlos Gardel in the 1933 French-made Les Studios Paramount Spanish musical romance Espérame, directed by Louis J. Gasnier.  Her final screen appearance was in the production At Five O'Clock in the Afternoon, a Spanish drama film directed in 1961 by Juan Antonio Bardem.

Filmography
Silent films
 La loca de la casa (1926)
 La ilustre fregona (1927)
 El orgullo de Albacete (1927)
Sound films
 Louis J. Gasnier|Espérame (1933) as Pepita
 Y tú, ¿qué haces? (1937)
 Barrios bajos (1937) as La Celestina
 La alegría de la huerta (1940)
 Una conquista difícil (1941)
 Heart of Gold (1941) as Rosa
 Pánico en el transatlántico (1942)
 We Thieves Are Honourable (1942)
 Malvaloca (1942) as Doña Enriqueta
 Audiencia pública (1946)
 Don Quixote de la Mancha (1947) as Doña Rodríguez
 Four Women (1947)
 Confidencia (1948) as Pueblerina
 A Man on the Road (1949)
 Cuento de hadas (1951)
 Malibran's Song (1951)
 Lola, la piconera (aka Lola, the Coalgirl) (1952) as Vieja de la reja
 Cerca de la ciudad (1952) as Criada de Doña Casilda
 Come Die My Love   (1952)
 Barco sin rumbo (1952)
 Segundo López, aventurero urbano (1953)
 ¡Che, qué loco! (1953) as Clotilde
 La alegre caravana (1953)
 La moza de cántaro (1954)
 Malvaloca (1954)
 Cómicos (aka Comedians) (1954)
 Amor sobre ruedas (1954)
 Agua sangrienta (1954)
 Noche de tormenta (1955)
 Nubes de verano (aka Summer's Clouds) (1955)
 Suspiros de Triana (aka Sighs of Triana) (1955)
 Una aventura de Gil Blas (aka The Adventures of Gil Blas) (1956)
 Encuentro en la ciudad (1956)
 Don Juan (1956)
 Curra Veleta (1956)
 Manolo guardia urbano (1956) as Vieja
 Piedras vivas (1956)
 Un fantasma llamado amor (1957)
 Ángeles sin cielo (aka Angels Sky) (1957)
 El hereje (1958)
 Llegaron dos hombres (aka Two Men in Town) (1959)
 They Fired with Their Lives (1959)
 Juicio final (1960)
 An American in Toledo (1960)
 At Five O'Clock in the Afternoon (1961) as Encargada de servicios

References

External links

20th-century Spanish actresses